Meglos is the second serial of the 18th season of the science fiction television series Doctor Who, which was first broadcast in four weekly parts on BBC1 from 27 September to 18 October 1980.

In the serial, the Zolfa-Thuran plant Meglos steals a huge source of power on the planet Tigella known as the Dodecahedron.

Plot

The Prion star system contains two habitable planets which have supported civilisations: Zolfa-Thura, a desert world devoid seemingly of life structures bar five giant screens; and Tigella, a jungle world inhabited by the humanoid, white haired Tigellans. The structure of Tigellan society is based on two castes: the scientific Savants, led by the earnest Deedrix, and the religiously fanatical Deons, led by Lexa. The latter worship the Dodecahedron, a mysterious twelve-sided crystal which they see as a gift from the god Ti. The Savants, however, have utilised its power as an energy source for their entire civilisation. The planet’s leader, Zastor, mediates between the two factions, whose tensions have grown greater as the energy source has begun to fluctuate. When Zastor’s old friend the Doctor gets in touch, the weary leader invites him back to Tigella to investigate and help. When the Fourth Doctor, Romana, and K9 try to land the TARDIS on Tigella they are trapped in a time loop (which they call a chronic hysteresis), causing them to repeat a small "pocket of time" over and over again.

The culprit is Meglos, the last Zolfa-Thuran, a cactus creature who has remained hidden below the surface of his planet in a secret structure. He has summoned a band of space pirates called Gaztaks to help him in an audacious plan. Meglos wants to steal the Dodecahedron back from Tigella, as it is a Zolfa-Thuran energy source of immense power. To aid him, Meglos uses an Earthling captured for him by the Gaztaks to occupy and take on humanoid form: and the humanoid form he chooses is the Doctor, whom he has trapped in the bubble. While the hysteresis persists Meglos gets the Gaztaks to take him to Tigella, and infiltrates the city in his new identity. Zastor greets “the Doctor” warmly as an old friend, asking him to examine the Dodecahedron, but others are less sure, especially Lexa.

The Doctor and Romana break out of the loop by throwing it out of phase, and then land on Tigella in the middle of the hostile jungle. As the Doctor heads off to find Zastor, Romana stumbles across dangerous vegetation – deadly bell plants – and then the Gaztaks, waiting patiently for Meglos to return to their spaceship. She gives them the slip after a while and heads off to the city.

Meglos has used his time as the Doctor to steal the Dodecahedron, shrinking it to minute size. However, the Earthling fights back against his occupation, causing green cactus spikes to break out on his skin. When the Tigellans discover that the Dodecahedron is missing and sound the alarm, Meglos hides away, but the real Doctor arrives at the same time and is accused of theft. His bewilderment and charm are little defence as both Savants and Deons start to panic as the energy levels of the city start to fail. Lexa uses the situation to her own ends. Zastor and Deedrix are arrested in a Deon coup, with other Savants expelled to the hostile surface of the planet, while the Doctor himself is prepared for sacrifice to Ti.

The doors of the city are sealed with Meglos trapped inside, with a hostage Savant named Caris for company. She soon gets the upper hand when the Earthling tries another bout of resistance. In a subsequent mix-up, Romana overpowers Caris, letting Meglos escape and reunite with the Gaztaks, who have staged an attack on the city to rescue him. With the miniaturized Dodecahedron in his possession, the pirates blast off back to Zolfa-Thura – though three Gaztaks, half the crew, have been lost.

The real Doctor has by now been able to prove that he did not steal the artefact and that there is a doppelgänger at work. Lexa realises her mistake but does not live long to regret it when she is shot dead while protecting Romana from a wounded Gaztak who was left behind. The Doctor, Romana, Caris, and Deedrix head with K9 for the TARDIS, determined to follow the Gaztak ship.

Grugger’s ship touches down on Zolfa-Thura and Meglos wastes no time in restoring the Dodecahedron to full size and placing it at a spot equidistant between the Screens. He reveals his race perished in a civil war over the control of the crystal, which can power a weapon strong enough to destroy planets. At Grugger’s urging Meglos decides to use the weapon again and to aim it at Tigella.

When the Doctor arrives, he plays Meglos at his own game and tries a little impersonation. The situation becomes so confused that the Gaztaks lose track of which one is which, enabling the Doctor to redirect the super-weapon at Zolfa-Thura before both he and Meglos are detained by the Gaztaks. Meglos abandons the Earthling, leaving a bemused man watching a cactus creature reassert himself in his laboratory. Meglos knows the Doctor has realigned the weapon. However, the creature is unable to stop the Doctor fleeing back to the TARDIS, taking the Earthling with him, and is also unable to persuade Grugger not to fire the weapon. From the TARDIS the Doctor and his friends witness the destruction of Zolfa-Thura, along with the Gaztaks, Meglos, and the Dodecahedron.

Caris and Deedrix return to rebuild Tigella, recognising with Zastor and the Deons that old enmities must be put aside and a new society forged. The Doctor and Romana depart and prepare to take the Earthling home, but as they are leaving Romana receives a message from the Time Lords that she must return to Gallifrey.

Production

Working titles for this story included The Golden Pentangle and The Last Zolfa-Thuran. This is one of only two multi-part stories to feature all credited cast members in every episode, the other being The Edge of Destruction (1964).

This story features the only use in Doctor Who of a camera-linking system known as Scene-Sync that allowed the use of non-static shots of characters superimposed onto a miniature set. As the cameras on the actors were moved, the cameras on the miniature set moved the equivalent scaled amount automatically. The exact scale motion was achieved by trial and error, involving minute adjustments to the voltage delivered to the slave camera's motors. Part Four's closing theme was transposed to the lower key of the original theme music.

During production of this story, Madame Tussauds in London debuted the "Doctor Who Exhibition". Included were sculptures of both the Fourth Doctor and his Meglos doppelganger. As a result, Tom Baker is the only person to have appeared twice in the wax museum.

When writing the 2010 story The Lodger, Gareth Roberts had thought of making it a sequel to Meglos but this sequel idea was ultimately dropped.

Cast notes
Jacqueline Hill, who played the First Doctor's companion Barbara Wright, makes a guest appearance as Lexa, marking the first time a companion has returned to play a role other than their original character. Brotadac is an anagram of "Bad Actor", an in-joke by the production team. Bill Fraser only agreed to take the role of Grugger on condition the character was allowed to kick K9. His request was granted; he later appeared in the spin-off pilot K-9 and Company. Crawford Logan also provided the voice of Meglos but was credited only as Deedrix.

Commercial releases

In print

Terrance Dicks' novelisation was published by Target Books in February 1983. Dicks names Meglos' unfortunate human host and bookends the novel with his kidnapping and subsequent return to Earth.  A French translation was published in 1987. An audiobook of the Target novelisation was released by BBC Audio on 1 July 2021 read by Jon Culshaw and John Leeson.

Home media
Meglos was released on VHS in April 2003, on DVD in January 2011, and as part of the Doctor Who DVD Files (issue 109) in March 2013. Paddy Kingsland and Peter Howell's incidental music for the serial was released as part of the compilation album Doctor Who at the BBC Radiophonic Workshop Volume 4: Meglos & Full Circle in 2002.

References

External links

Target novelisation

Fourth Doctor serials
Doctor Who serials novelised by Terrance Dicks
1980 British television episodes